Etnedal is a municipality in Innlandet county, Norway. It is located in the traditional district of Valdres. The administrative centre of the municipality is the village of Bruflat.

The  municipality is the 216th largest by area out of the 356 municipalities in Norway. Etnedal is the 314th most populous municipality in Norway with a population of 1,256.

General information

Etnedal was created as a new municipality on 1 January 1894 by merging the eastern valley area of Nordre Etnedal (population: 362) from the neighboring Nordre Aurdal municipality and the Søndre Etnedal area (population: 1,331) from the neighboring municipality of Søndre Aurdal. On 1 January 1979, there was a border adjustment in an unpopulated area where part of Etnedal was transferred to Nord-Aurdal and another part of Nord-Aurdal that was transferred to Etnedal.

Name
The municipality was named after the local Etna river valley ("Etnadalen") which runs through the area. The first element is the genitive case of the river name Etna and the last element is dalr which means "valley" or "dale". The meaning of the river name is unknown but it is possibly derived from etja (meaning "push forward") or eta (meaning "eat").

Coat of arms
The coat of arms was granted by royal decree on 14 July 1989. The arms show the old Lunde bridge in gold on a blue background. It is one of the best preserved stone bridges in the country and it is now a national monument. It is also Northern Europe's largest dry stone-arch bridge. The bridge was built in 1829 on the Old King's Road connecting Oslo and Bergen. A portion of the king's road was refurbished and turned into a footpath in 1992 and is now a natural and cultural walking path.

Churches
The Church of Norway has two parishes within the municipality of Etnedal. It is part of the Valdres prosti (deanery) in the Diocese of Hamar.

Geography
Etnedal is part of the traditional district of Valdres in central, southern Norway, situated between the Gudbrandsdal and Hallingdal valleys. Valdres also includes the municipalities Nord-Aurdal, Sør-Aurdal, Øystre Slidre, Vestre Slidre, and Vang. Etnedal is bordered to the east by Nordre Land Municipality, to the south by Sør-Aurdal Municipality, and on the west and north by Nord-Aurdal Municipality.

The river Etna flows through the municipality, then into Nordre Land municipality and then down into Randsfjorden. The mountain Spåtind lies in the northern part of the municipality.

Economy

Occupations in the municipality include animal husbandry and logging, but there is also some industry and tourism.

Government
All municipalities in Norway, including Etnedal, are responsible for primary education (through 10th grade), outpatient health services, senior citizen services, unemployment and other social services, zoning, economic development, and municipal roads.  The municipality is governed by a municipal council of elected representatives, which in turn elects a mayor.  The municipality falls under the Vestre Innlandet District Court and the Eidsivating Court of Appeal.

Municipal council
The municipal council  of Etnedal is made up of 15 representatives that are elected to four year terms.  The party breakdown of the council is as follows:

Mayors
The list of mayors of Etnedal:

1894–1900: Arild Huitfeldt Siewers
1900–1901: Nils Hagaseth
1901–1904: Erik Thon
1904–1907: Aslak E. Bruflat
1907–1913: Engebret Espelien
1913–1919: Nils Nielsen
1919–1922: Carl Christian Wishman
1922–1925: Ole E. Bruflat (V)
1925–1928: Martin Lundstein (V)
1928–1931: Ole E. Bruflat (V)
1931–1934: Engebret Haug
1934–1937: Ole E. Bruflat (V)
1937–1940: Torleiv Hodne (Ap)
1940–1945: (Vacant due to the war)
1946–1959: Iver K. Haug (V)
1960–1967: Nicolai Hestekind (H)
1968–1974: Ole Fløgum (Ap)
1975-1975: Kristian Midthus (Sp)
1976–1979: Alfred Steinset (KrF)
1980–1983: Knut Engelien (Sp)
1984–1999: Odd Byfuglien (Sp)
1999–2014: Jan Arild Berg (Sp)
2014–2019: Toril Grønbrekk (Ap)
2019–present: Linda Mæhlum Robøle (Sp)

Notable people 
 Sigurd Lybeck (1895 in Etnedal – 1975), a Norwegian writer, featured Jens von Bustenskjold
 Iacob Dybwad Sømme (1898 in Etnedal – 1944), a Norwegian ichthyologist and resistance member
 Ingjerd Thon Hagaseth (born 1967), a Norwegian politician, deputy mayor of Etnedal
 Ingebjørg Saglien Bråten (born 1999 in Etnedal), a Norwegian ski jumper

References

External links

Municipal fact sheet from Statistics Norway 

Etnedal Municipality 

 
Municipalities of Innlandet
1894 establishments in Norway
Valdres